Vamos a Alabar, sometimes also known as Levantate, is a Spanish language Christian song that has been recorded by many Christian artists across Latin America, including Wanda Batista, the United Methodist Church's "Ebenezer" band in Puerto Rico and others. The song is sung both in Protestant and Catholic churches.

External references

Year of song missing
Christian songs
Spanish songs
Songwriter unknown